Knud Erik Fisker (born 17 September 1960) was a Danish football referee. He was a full international for FIFA since 1994 until 2005.

References 

1960 births
Living people
Danish football referees